Syed Muhammad Ishtiaq Urmar is a Pakistani politician from Peshawar who was a member of the Provincial Assembly of Khyber Pakhtunkhwa from May 2013 to May 2018 and from August 2018 to January 2023 the Pakistan Tehreek-e-Insaf.

Political career
Ishtiaq was elected as the member of the Khyber Pakhtunkhwa Assembly on the Pakistan Tehreek-e-Insaf ticket from PK-11 (Peshawar-XI) in the 2013 Pakistani general election.

References

Living people
Pashtun people
Pakistan Tehreek-e-Insaf MPAs (Khyber Pakhtunkhwa)
Khyber Pakhtunkhwa MPAs 2013–2018
People from Peshawar
Year of birth missing (living people)